Charles L. Scofield (born February 15, 1925) is an American retired politician who was a member of the North Dakota House of Representatives. He represented the 1st district in the North Dakota House of Representatives from 1973 to 1980, as a Republican. He is a past president of the North Dakota Broadcasters Association, the Williston Chamber of Commerce, and Williston Kiwanis Club.

References

1925 births
Living people
Republican Party members of the North Dakota House of Representatives
People from Williston, North Dakota